Derek Scott (born 4 August 1964) is a New Zealand former cricketer. He played eleven first-class and eleven List A matches for Auckland between 1984 and 1989.

See also
 List of Auckland representative cricketers

References

External links
 

1964 births
Living people
New Zealand cricketers
Auckland cricketers
Cricketers from Auckland